Jimmy Fink is a New York metropolitan area radio personality, producer and writer.

Early life and education 
Fink was born and raised in Eastchester, New York. His family owned the Fink Bakery, a New York City which operated in Manhattan and Long Island City from 1888 to 2000.

Fink studied drama at the University of Arizona from 1967–69 and received a BA degree in Speech Arts/Communications from The American University in Washington DC in 1971. While at American University, he participated in the early development of the school's radio station, WAMU-FM, and worked at rock station WHFS in Bethesda Maryland. From 1971–72, as a graduate student, he studied electronic music at The New School for Social Research in New York City.

Career
Fink began his professional radio career in the fledgling days of New York FM radio at WABC-FM, which later became WPLJ.  From 1970-83 he worked for WPLJ as an on-air personality, and is one of the better-known on-air personalities in New York FM radio.  In 1985, he was one of the first New York air personalities to join the new K-Rock, WXRK, in New York City.

Fink has also done voiceover work for HBO, Cinemax and various other commercial clients.  He was the longtime producer for various nationally syndicated shows on the ABC Rock Radio Network, including Rock & Roll Legends, a daily calendar of rock events, and New Waves, an interview program distributed by NPR focusing on rock stars' youth and upbringing.  Rolling Stone Magazine's Continuous History of Rock & Roll, written and produced by Fink, was heard worldwide on 140 radio stations.  His interviews with rock stars have been featured in hundreds of radio programs.  He was the host of Rock Watch, a nationally syndicated show for the United Stations Radio Network.  Currently he is writing and producing the10@10, a daily program on 107.1 The Peak featuring "ten great songs from one great year."

In 2004, he became the afternoon drivetime host on 107.1 The Peak, WXPK-FM a suburban New York radio station owned by Pamal Broadcasting.

Honors and awards 
In July 2008, and again in 2010, Fink was named "Best Radio Personality" by the readers of Westchester Magazine in its annual "Best of Westchester" issue.

References

External links
The Peak : Air Staff - The Peak radio website. (archived 2008)
WPLJ air staff history
Westchester Magazine: Best Of Westchester

Year of birth missing (living people)
Living people
Radio personalities from New York City
Eastchester High School alumni
American University School of Communication alumni
People from Eastchester, New York